The Australia national association football team represented Australia at the FIFA Confederations Cup on four occasions, in 1997, 2001, 2005 and 2017.

Record at the FIFA Confederations Cup

Record by opponent

1997 FIFA Confederations Cup

Group A

Semi-final

Final

2001 FIFA Confederations Cup

Group A

Semi-final

Bronze Final

2005 FIFA Confederations Cup

Group A

2017 FIFA Confederations Cup

Group B

Goalscorers

References

Australia national soccer team
Countries at the FIFA Confederations Cup